Reginald Ernest Thoy (12 May 1921 – 2 December 1993) was an English cricketer. A right-handed batsman, he played two first-class matches in the 1950s.

Biography

Born in Singapore in 1921, Thoy's first recorded cricket was two matches for the Straits Settlements against the Federated Malay States in 1939 and 1940.

In England after the war, he played a Minor Counties Championship match for the Kent Second XI against the Surrey Second XI in 1948, though he never played for the first team. He later played two first-class matches for DR Jardine's XI against Oxford University in 1955 and 1957.

He died in Maidstone, Kent in 1993, though his obituary in the Wisden Cricketers' Almanack incorrectly gives his year of death as 1994.

References

1921 births
1993 deaths
English cricketers
Straits Settlements cricketers
D. R. Jardine's XI cricketers
British people in British Malaya